The Valdostan regional election of 1973 took place on 10 June 1973.

The alliance of 1970 was initially confirmed, but the situation was later changed by the Valdostan Union and the Christian Democracy.

Results

Sources: Regional Council of Aosta Valley and Istituto Cattaneo

Elections in Aosta Valley
1973 elections in Italy
June 1973 events in Europe